Kate Hall  (born 21 May 1983) is a Danish and English singer.

Biography
Hall was born in Harwich, Essex, to an English mother and a Danish father and moved to Allerød at the age of three. As a child, she received lessons in singing, piano and dancing. When she was twelve years old, she was accepted into the Danish Radio Girls' choir. A year later, she made studio recordings for Postman Pat. She appeared as a television presenter in The Voice TV Danmark, and reached the final of the Danish edition of Popstars where she finished third.

After being discovered by the German music producer, Alex Christensen, she reached the German charts with the single "Is There Anybody Out There?" in June 2005.

Hall was engaged to German singer Ben, and in 2007 released four duet singles, "Bedingungslos", "Du bist wie Musik", "Ich lieb dich immer noch so", and "Zwei Herzen" with him. In November 2008, she announced that the engagement had ended, after which she continued as a solo singer.

She was a vocal coach in the seventh and tenth series of the German edition of Popstars. In 2009, Hall married German dancer Detlef D! Soost, whom she met during her time at Popstars.

In January 2013, Hall was announced as one of the participants in the 2013 Danish National Song Contest, the winner of which would represent Denmark in the Eurovision Song Contest.

She has been living in Germany.

References

External links

Official site of Kate & Ben (archived)

1983 births
Living people
British emigrants to Denmark
21st-century Danish women singers
Danish people of English descent
Danish expatriates in Germany
English expatriates in Germany
English-language singers from Denmark
English people of Danish descent
German-language singers
Musicians from Essex
People from Harwich
21st-century English women singers
21st-century English singers